Events from 1689 in the Kingdom of Scotland

Incumbents
Monarch – William II and Mary II (from 11 May)
Secretary of State – John Drummond, 1st Earl of Melfort, then from 13 May George Melville, 1st Earl of Melville

Events
 16 March–5 June – Convention of the Estates of Scotland sits to determine the settlement of the Scottish throne following the invasion of the Kingdom of England by William, Prince of Orange in 1688
 18 March – King's Own Scottish Borderers is raised to defend Edinburgh against Jacobite forces
 4 April – Convention of Estates votes to remove James VII from office for forfeiture; going on to adopt the Claim of Right Act 1689
 20 April – Robert Lundy secretly flees Derry for Scotland.
 11 May – William and Mary accept the Convention's offer of the crown on the day they are crowned King and Queen of England and Scotland at Westminster Abbey
 16 May – Battle of Loup Hill on Kintyre between Jacobite forces commanded by Donald MacNeill of Gallchoille and government forces commanded by Captain William Young
 c. 5 June – Lords of the Articles abolished
 22 July – the Parliament of Scotland votes to abolish episcopacy
 27 July – Battle of Killiecrankie: Covenanter supporters of William and Mary (under Hugh Mackay) are defeated by the Jacobites though the latter's leader, John Graham, Viscount Dundee, is killed
 21 August – Battle of Dunkeld: the Orange Covenanter Cameronian Guard defeat the Jacobite clans in street fighting though the Cameronian Colonel William Cleland is killed

Births
 7 January – Robert Murray, soldier and Member of Parliament (died 1738)
 14 April – William Murray, Marquess of Tullibardine, soldier and Jacobite leader (died 1746 in the Tower of London)
 October – William Adam, architect, mason and entrepreneur (died 1748)

Deaths
 31 March – George Lockhart, advocate and Member of Parliament (born 1630)
 27 July – John Graham, 1st Viscount Dundee, nobleman and soldier, killed at the Battle of Killiecrankie (born 1648)
 21 August – William Cleland, poet and soldier, killed at the Battle of Dunkeld (born 1661)

See also
 Timeline of Scottish history

References

 
1680s in Scotland